The 2020 NASCAR Xfinity Series was the 39th season of the NASCAR Xfinity Series, a stock car racing series sanctioned by NASCAR in the United States. The season began at Daytona International Speedway with the NASCAR Racing Experience 300 on February 15. The regular season will end with the Go Bowling 250 at Richmond Raceway on September 11. The NASCAR playoffs will end with the Desert Diamond Casino West Valley 200 at Phoenix Raceway on November 7.

Tyler Reddick won the 2018 and 2019 championship, but did not defend his title as he moved up to the Cup Series in 2020, continuing to drive for Richard Childress Racing.

When the season was put on hold due to the COVID-19 pandemic, drivers from all NASCAR series, including many Xfinity Series drivers, participated in the inaugural eNASCAR iRacing Pro Invitational Series during that time.

Following the 2020 Virginia is for Racing Lovers 250 at Richmond Raceway, Austin Cindric clinched the Regular Season Championship. He went on to become the 2020 Xfinity Series Champion after winning the season-ending race at Phoenix. In addition, Team Penske claimed its sixth Owners' Championship, Chevrolet won the Manufacturer's Championship, and Harrison Burton took the NASCAR Rookie of the Year honors.

Teams and drivers

Complete schedule

Limited schedule

Notes

Changes

Teams
 On September 9, 2019, it was reported that GMS Racing was considering shutting down their No. 23 Xfinity team in 2020 if additional sponsorship couldn't be found, although the team would continue to compete in the Truck Series. This was officially announced on November 21, 2019. The team's assets and owner points would be purchased by the new Our Motorsports No. 02 team.
 On October 28, 2019, ARCA Menards Series East team owner Sam Hunt announced that his Sam Hunt Racing team would move up to the Xfinity Series in 2020, with their East Series driver Colin Garrett also racing for the team in Xfinity. The team initially announced that they would run five races, and any additional races they would run depended on how much sponsorship the team's crowdfunding model would generate.
 On October 30, 2019, it was announced that Our Motorsports, a part-time ARCA Menards Series team which also formerly competed in the NASCAR Whelen Modified Tour, would compete full-time in the Xfinity Series in 2020 after buying cars and equipment from the GMS Racing No. 23 team, which closed down after the 2019 season. The team's No. 02 car would be driven by multiple drivers, including team co-owner Andy Seuss and later GMS Truck Series driver Brett Moffitt.
 On December 8, 2019, MBM Motorsports driver Tommy Joe Martins posted a video to his Twitter saying that he would not be back with the team in 2020 because they would likely be reducing from four full-time cars to two. Team owner Carl Long confirmed this news on December 19, 2019.
 On December 24, 2019, it was announced that Martins Motorsports, owned by driver Tommy Joe Martins and his father Craig, would be re-opening in 2020. They will field a full-time Xfinity Series team in 2020, the No. 44 Chevrolet, with Tommy Joe driving in all races unless other drivers who bring sponsorship are found which would take him out of the driver's seat at any time. Also, unlike when the team last competed, they will have another owner, Rodney Riessen, a longtime friend of the Martins family.
 On January 15, 2020, DGM Racing announced that their No. 36 team would be renumbered to the No. 92 in 2020, which was previously the number for their third part-time team. Josh Williams will continue as the driver of that car for the second year in a row. In a number swap between DGM cars, the old No. 92 car will now have the No. 36, and Alex Labbé will drive it in at least three races, one of which is the season-opener at Daytona. It could even turn into a full-season effort if sponsorship is found.
 On January 19, 2020, Mike Harmon Racing announced that they would be renumbering their second car, the No. 17, to the No. 47 (which is the No. 74, the number of their primary car, backwards) for this season. Harmon took over the No. 17 in large part from Rick Ware Racing partway through the 2019 season.
 On January 21, 2020, RSS Racing revealed that they would only be fielding two cars full-time, the No. 39 and the No. 93, with the No. 38, which was previously for the most part a start and park car, going down to part-time for 2020. The No. 38 will be entered at Daytona and Talladega with Jeff Green, and will only be fielded in other races if sponsorship is found.
 On February 3, 2020, Bob Pockrass reported the following owner points transfers for 2020: GMS Racing No. 23 to the Our Motorsports No. 02, Stewart-Haas Racing with Biagi-DenBeste No. 98 to Jimmy Means Racing No. 52, MBM Motorsports No. 61 to the Hattori Racing Enterprises No. 61, Jimmy Means Racing No. 52 to the Mike Harmon Racing No. 74. Internal owners points transfers consist of the following: Stewart-Haas Racing with Biagi-DenBeste No. 00 to No. 98, DGM Racing No. 92 to No. 36, RSS Racing No. 93 to No. 39, MBM Motorsports No. 35 to No. 66 and No. 66 to No. 13, Brandonbilt Motorsports No. 86 to 68, B. J. McLeod Motorsports No. 99 to No. 78, and JD Motorsports No. 01 to No. 6, No. 0 to No. 4, No. 15 to No. 0, and No. 4 to No. 15.
 On May 23, 2020, Ray Black Jr. announced that he would no longer be driving the No. 07 for SS-Green Light Racing in order to concentrate on helping his family business, the CDA Technical Institute, recover after it experienced financial problems due to the COVID-19 pandemic. After Black's departure, it was announced that Rick Ware Racing had cut a deal with SS-Green Light to field some of their drivers in the No. 07 for the remainder of the season. This began with Garrett Smithley in the car for Charlotte and Carson Ware, Rick's son, making his series debut at Bristol.

Drivers
 On September 24, 2019, it was announced that Christopher Bell will move up to the NASCAR Cup Series for 2020, driving the No. 95 for Leavine Family Racing and vacating his No. 20 Joe Gibbs Racing Toyota in the Xfinity Series.
 On October 2, 2019, it was confirmed by Richard Childress Racing that Tyler Reddick will be moving up to the Cup Series with them full-time in 2020, replacing Daniel Hemric in the No. 8 Chevrolet.
 On October 15, 2019, it was announced that Ross Chastain will be driving for Kaulig Racing full-time in 2020 in their No. 10 car after running part-time for the team in 2019. In that announcement, the team also confirmed that Justin Haley would be returning to drive the No. 11.
 On October 17, 2019, it was announced that Harrison Burton would be driving for Joe Gibbs Racing full-time in 2020 in their No. 20 Toyota, replacing Christopher Bell while also competing for Rookie of the Year honors. In 2019, Burton drove full-time in the Truck Series driving the No. 18 Toyota Tundra for Kyle Busch Motorsports while also making some limited starts in the Xfinity Series, driving the No. 18 Toyota for Gibbs.
 On October 18, 2019, Kaulig Racing president Chris Rice announced that the team intended on fielding their No. 16 car part-time in 2020, with the tentative plan being for A. J. Allmendinger to return for all the road course races plus the new Martinsville race in October. Rice also stated they will field the car at the restrictor plate races, but they have not yet decided on a driver. On December 30, 2019, Rice confirmed in an interview with Larry McReynolds on Sirius XM NASCAR Radio that Allmendinger would drive the No. 16 at Daytona in February. On January 30, 2020, Kaulig Racing announced that Allmendinger would run for a total of eight races, which were all five road course events and all three restrictor plate races. Allmendinger would later add the spring Bristol race and Atlanta to his schedule as well. After winning the race at Atlanta, the Sunday Homestead race was also added to his schedule so he could run for the Dash 4 Cash.
 On November 5, 2019, it was announced that Riley Herbst will drive the No. 18 Toyota full-time for Joe Gibbs Racing in 2020.
 On November 7, 2019, it was announced that Jesse Little will drive for JD Motorsports full-time in 2020.
 On November 13, 2019, it was announced that Daniel Hemric will return to the Xfinity Series to drive the JR Motorsports No. 8 Chevrolet for 21 races. In addition, Jeb Burton will drive the car for 11 races and team co-owner Dale Earnhardt Jr. will return for one race.
 On November 21, 2019, it was announced that Myatt Snider will run part-time for Richard Childress Racing in 2020, beginning at the season-opening race at Daytona International Speedway.
 On November 22, 2019, it was announced that C. J. McLaughlin will return to RSS Racing for at least 20 races in 2020.
 On December 3, 2019, it was announced that Anthony Alfredo would run a part-time Xfinity schedule for Richard Childress Racing in the same car as Myatt Snider, which was confirmed to be the No. 21 again in 2020. Last year, Alfredo drove for DGR-Crosley part-time in the Truck Series.
 On December 4, 2019, Landon Cassill said that he plans to race full-time in the Shepherd Racing Ventures No. 89 Chevrolet in 2020, should funding be available. He drove that car part-time in 2019 as well as for the last race of the 2018 season.
 On December 6, 2019, Richard Childress Racing publicly stated that they would be interested in hiring Daniel Suárez either to drive the No. 2 Chevrolet or if sponsorship was found, for a third Cup team in 2020. Suárez previously drove for Joe Gibbs Racing from 2015 to 2018 (with the last two years being in the Cup Series) and for Stewart-Haas Racing in 2019.
 On December 8, 2019, Tommy Joe Martins announced via Twitter that he would likely be let go by MBM Motorsports in 2020. He had previously signed with the team in Summer 2019 to return for this year, but that has changed since the team now looks to scale back to two cars. On December 24, it was announced that Martins will drive the No. 44 Chevrolet of the returning Martins Motorsports in 2020.
 On December 19, 2019, Carl Long said that Joey Gase would not be back with his team in 2020 as part of their reduction from four full-time teams to two. The following day, Gase was announced to be moving up to the Cup Series full-time driving for Rick Ware Racing.
 On January 9, 2020, JD Motorsports announced that Colby Howard will be joining the team for the majority of the season starting at Phoenix.
 On January 14, 2020, RSS Racing announced the return of Jeff Green in the No. 38 Chevrolet. He is back after sitting out for the second half of the 2019 season due to having surgery. The team had previously stated before this happened that they wanted to have him back in 2020 if he was medically cleared to race.
 On January 16, 2020, it was announced that Joe Graf Jr. will race full-time in the SS-Green Light Racing No. 08 Chevrolet.
 On January 22, 2020, MBM Motorsports announced that Stephen Leicht would be joining the team to drive the No. 13 in a few races, the first of which will be at Las Vegas. In other races where he is not driving, such as at Daytona, he will be a spotter for one of the team's other cars. In 2019, Leicht ran a full season in the Xfinity Series in the No. 01 for JD Motorsports.
 On January 28, 2020, it was announced that Mason Massey would drive the No. 99 for B. J. McLeod Motorsports in a number of races in the 2020 season, starting at Las Vegas Motor Speedway in February.
 On January 28, 2020, Chris Cockrum announced he would run at least three races in the ACG Motorsports No. 25 Chevrolet.
 On January 30, 2020, Our Motorsports announced that Brett Moffitt would drive the No. 02 Chevrolet for the first four races in the season. Moffitt also ended up driving the fifth race of the season at Darlington on top of the first four races. Patrick Emerling was announced on May 20, 2020, to be making his debut in the series in the No. 02 at Bristol in May.
 On February 7, 2020, JD Motorsports announced that Jeffrey Earnhardt would rejoin the team to drive in twelve races in 2020. He drove the No. 4 car full-time in 2014. For about half of 2019, Earnhardt was without a ride after being released from his part-time rides with Joe Gibbs Racing and XCI Racing.
 On February 11, 2020, Jimmy Means Racing announced that J. J. Yeley will drive the No. 52 Chevrolet in the first three races of the season.
 On February 20, 2020, Joe Gibbs Racing announced that Kyle Busch will drive the No. 54 Toyota at Phoenix, Charlotte, Chicagoland, Loudon and Watkins Glen.
 On March 4, 2020, Tony Stewart announced that he would come out of retirement and race at the Indianapolis road course race on the July 4th weekend. This is his first Xfinity start since 2013 at Daytona, a race that he won. It is also his first race in the series at a track other than Daytona since 2009. However, reporter Jenna Fryer tweeted on June 9, 2020, that Stewart had decided to not enter the race after it was announced that no fans would be allowed to attend it due to COVID-19.
 On April 14, 2020, JD Motorsports announced that Mike Wallace, who drove for them from 2009 through 2013, would reunite with the team to drive the No. 0 car at the Indianapolis road course. This will be his first NASCAR and Xfinity Series start since 2015 following an unofficial retirement. On September 10, NASCAR suspended Wallace indefinitely and ordered him to perform sensitivity training after he made a post on social media that violated the sport's member conduct guidelines.
 On May 18, 2020, David Starr tweeted that he has parted ways with JD Motorsports due to the COVID-19 pandemic affecting sponsorship.
 On July 22, 2020, it was announced that Andy Seuss had left Our Motorsports. He was set to make a number of starts with them in the No. 02 throughout the season, but had yet to make any at the time of his departure from the team. (After some strong runs in the car, Brett Moffitt ended up running additional races in it.) Meanwhile, hours later, it was announced that Andy Lally, would be driving for the team at Road America and the Daytona Road Course.

Crew chiefs
 Jason Ratcliff moved up to the No. 95 Leavine Family Racing entry in the NASCAR Cup Series in 2020, continuing to work with driver Christopher Bell as he takes over that ride next year, and vacated his position as crew chief of the No. 20 Joe Gibbs Racing car in the Xfinity Series.
 On November 5, 2019, Richard Childress Racing announced that Randall Burnett would be moving up from the No. 2 team to the No. 8 RCR Cup car, continuing to work with driver Tyler Reddick as he takes over that ride next year, meaning he will vacate his position as crew chief of the No. 2 NXS car in 2020.
 On November 7, 2019, Joe Gibbs Racing announced changes to their crew chief lineup for 2020 with No. 18 crew chief Ben Beshore replacing Ratcliff as crew chief of the No. 20 team (where he will work with Harrison Burton), with Dave Rogers replacing Beshore as the No. 18 crew chief (where he will work with Riley Herbst). Rogers was previously the technical director for JGR's Xfinity operations since mid-2017; it is unclear who will replace him in that position in 2020 when he returns to being a crew chief.
 On December 4, 2019, Stewart-Haas Racing announced that Mike Shiplett will move up to the No. 41 team in the NASCAR Cup Series, replacing Billy Scott and continuing to work with driver Cole Custer.
 On December 18, 2019, MBM Motorsports revealed the crew chiefs for their Xfinity Series teams in 2020, with Ryan Bell working with Timmy Hill and Daniel Johnson working with Chad Finchum. However, on January 12, 2019, Martins Motorsports announced that Johnson would be the crew chief of his No. 44 team (and therefore, departing MBM). Both Martins and Johnson were together at MBM at the end of the 2019 season.
 On January 14, 2020, RSS Racing announced that Clifford Turner would be returning to be the crew chief of their No. 38 team after being suspended in June of last year due to violating the Substance Abuse Policy. Although Turner was reinstated in September, he did not return to crew chiefing the car for the remainder of the 2019 season.
 On January 15, 2020, it was announced that Shane Wilson, who crew chiefed Ryan Sieg and his No. 39 team in 2019, leading him to having many good runs and a playoff spot, would not be back with the team because he joined DGR-Crosley to crew chief Tanner Gray and their No. 15 Truck Series team.
 On January 17, 2020, Bruce Schlicker was announced as Ross Chastain's crew chief on the Kaulig Racing No. 10 car. He previously worked as the engineer for Cole Custer and the Stewart Haas Racing with Biagi-DenBeste No. 00 team, which closed down. Prior to that, he was an engineer with Richard Childress Racing. He also has crew chief experience in 2010 with the MSRP Motorsports No. 90 car and part of 2009 with the SK Motorsports No. 07 car as well as interim crew chief for Custer's No. 00 in three races in 2018.
 On January 21, 2020, it was announced that Jeff Green would be the crew chief for RSS Racing's No. 93 team (driven by C. J. McLaughlin, Myatt Snider, Joey Gase, and other drivers to be determined) in the races where he is not driving the team's No. 38 car.
 On January 28, 2020, Richard Childress Racing announced that Andy Street has been promoted to crew chief of the No. 21 Chevrolet.
 On June 13, 2020, following the Hooters 250 at Homestead–Miami Speedway, Stewart-Haas Racing No. 98 crew chief Richard Boswell, car chief Nick Hutchins, and engineer D. J. Vanderley were suspended for four races after a tungsten ballast came loose and fell off the frame rail of the car during the start of the race. SHR executive Greg Zipadelli stepped in as the No. 98's crew chief at the Contender Boats 250.
 On June 26, 2020, Mike Harmon Racing No. 74 crew chief Teddy Brown was suspended indefinitely following his June 8 arrest in Iredell County, North Carolina for habitual misdemeanor assault.

Sponsorship
 On December 2, 2019, NASCAR announced that the organization will not allow CBD sponsorships partly due to restrictions from its media rights partners and also because of FIA regulations (cannabinoids, which CBD is part, is a Prohibited Substance in the WADA Code that is used by the FIA; NASCAR is a member of the ASN of the FIA in the United States, the Automobile Competition Committee for the United States).
 On January 14, 2020, it was reported that NASCAR was in advanced discussions with Verizon Communications on a new partnership, which includes upgrading the tracks with 5G technology.
 On September 23, 2020, Jeremy Clements Racing announced it has parted ways with longtime sponsor RepairableVehicles.com, ending a partnership that lasted for 10 years. The team will look for new sponsors for the remainder of the season and 2021.

Rule changes
 NASCAR Cup Series drivers will only be allowed to compete in five races, down from seven in 2019. Similar to 2019, Cup drivers are not allowed to compete in Dash 4 Cash as well as the final eight races of the season (the final race before the playoffs and the NASCAR playoffs). Unlike 2019, the rule now applies to drivers declaring for Cup Series points with three or more years of Cup Series experience, down from five years of experience in 2019.
 The Xfinity Series field will be reduced to 36 cars in 2020, down from 38 in 2019.
 Controlled cautions will be used at Mid-Ohio Sports Car Course, Iowa Speedway, and Road America. This procedure includes restrictions on tire changes and refueling to prevent teams from hiring specialized pit crews for standalone races. The controlled caution procedure will not be in effect for weekends where either series is with the Cup Series. The rules are as follows:
Each team will consist of eight pit crew members. This includes four to service the car, one fueler, and one driver assistant.
On oval tracks, teams may add fuel and change two tires per pit stop.
On road courses, teams may add fuel or change four tires per pit stop.
Restarts under caution will be in the following order:
 Cars that did not pit.
 Cars that pitted one time, followed by two times.
 Free Pass, Wave Around vehicles, Penalty vehicles.
 Teams involved in incidents are allowed to change four tires at once to avoid damaging the vehicle.
Penalties are as follows:
 A team must restart on the tail end of the lead lap if they exceed the time limit on pit road or they pit other than the designated lap.
 A team must serve a two-lap penalty if they change all four tires and add fuel on any pit stop, change tires under green (unless approved by NASCAR for damage caused by an incident), or perform a four-tire change on any pit stop (ovals only).

Changes due to the coronavirus (COVID-19) pandemic
In NASCAR's first races back since the pandemic hit, there would be no practice or qualifying held so that teams would not need to bring additional crew members to the track and would not need to bring backup cars. (Crew members would be in contact with each other when repairing a primary car damaged in practice or qualifying or to prepare a backup car if a team had to utilize it).

In the Xfinity Series and Gander RV & Outdoors Truck Series races that will be held without practice and qualifying, NASCAR announced that the field size temporarily will be expanded to a maximum of 40 vehicles each. The field will be set by a random draw, similar to NASCAR Cup Series.

On July 21, NASCAR announced that the remaining national series events on the 2020 schedule will be held without practice and qualifying.

Schedule
NASCAR announced the 2020 Xfinity Series schedule on April 3, 2019.

Notes:
 The B&L Transport 170 at Mid-Ohio Sports Car Course will move to a May date instead of its August date in 2019. (However, this changed when the race was canceled as part of the COVID-19 schedule changes.)
 The June race at Iowa Speedway will now become a night race instead of a day race that it was in 2019. (However, this changed when the race was cancelled as part of the COVID-19 schedule changes.)
 The O'Reilly Auto Parts 300 at Texas Motor Speedway will now become a day race instead of a night race that it was in 2019.
 The new Martinsville race will be held at night. It will be the first time the series has raced there under the lights.
 The August race at Iowa and Road America was originally supposed to air on CNBC due to the 2020 Summer Olympics on NBC and NBCSN. (However, this changed as part of the COVID-19 schedule changes.)
 The Pennzoil 150 will move to the Indianapolis Motor Speedway road course and will move from NBCSN to NBC.
 The Dash 4 Cash races (listed in bold) are at Atlanta, Homestead race 2, Talladega and Pocono.

Schedule changes

 The EchoPark 250 at Atlanta will no longer be the second race of the season and moves a month later to become the fifth race of the season, and also the first race after the West Coast swing.
 The order of races in the West Coast swing changes, with the series now going to Auto Club Speedway (Fontana) before Phoenix Raceway instead of the other way around as it had been in the past. Because there will be no race in between Daytona and the West Coast swing, Las Vegas will now be the second race of the season (instead of the third) and the flip-flop of California and Phoenix will be the third and fourth races. (Phoenix had been the fourth race previously and now is still the fourth race after this switch.)
 After being the season-finale for the Xfinity Series since 1995 and all three national series since 2002, Homestead-Miami Speedway lost its place as the last race of the season and will instead have its race in March between Atlanta and Texas on a weekend that had previously been an off weekend which will now be in April the week after Bristol.
 After previously having two races on the schedule, Richmond lost its spring date in favor of a race at Martinsville in October, which marks the series' first trip to the track in 14 years, when it hosted a race for one year in 2006 (in between when the series stopped going to Pikes Peak after 2005 and started going to Montreal in 2007). The race at Martinsville in October will be the second-to-last race of the season and the last race of the Round of 8 in the playoffs. The Gander RV & Outdoors Truck Series will now race on the spring weekend at Richmond instead, while Martinsville will only hold one truck race in the fall.
 After being held sometime in August every year it has been on the schedule, Mid-Ohio moves earlier in the season to become the first race held after Charlotte on Memorial Day weekend, replacing Pocono.
 The Pocono Green 225 at Pocono will be held on the last week of June, replacing Chicagoland. The race will be held on a Sunday afternoon instead of Saturday afternoon as part of the new "doubleheader-weekend" where the Cup Series will run both of their races at the track on the same weekend on consecutive days (on Saturday in addition to the Truck Series and Sunday in addition to the Xfinity Series).
 The Camping World 300 at Chicagoland moves a week earlier than it was in 2019. It now falls on Father's Day weekend, which had previously been an off-weekend for the series, and that off-weekend was moved to July after the race at New Hampshire, as NBC will start their half of the season earlier.
 After having hosted a night race on the Fourth of July weekend since 2002 in the Xfinity Series, Daytona's summer race will now be in August, trading places with Indianapolis but on January 15, 2020, it was announced the race will be contested on the road course instead of the oval.
 The U.S. Cellular 250 at Iowa moves back a week, on the weekend where Watkins Glen had been.
 After Mid-Ohio's race moved back to late May/early June, Road America's race moved into that weekend in August from where it had been previously later in the month.
 The Zippo 200 at The Glen at Watkins Glen moved two weeks later in place of the Food City 300 at Bristol, which will now be a month later and part of the playoffs.
 The Use Your Melon Drive Sober 200 at Dover was knocked out of the playoffs and into the regular season as a result of Bristol being put in. That race at Dover will now be held on August 22 (the weekend where Road America had been).
 Since Labor Day falls later in the year in 2020, the race at Daytona will now be held before Darlington instead of after so Darlington can remain on Labor Day weekend.
 The Go Bowling 250 at Richmond will now be earlier in September and become the last race before the start of the playoffs based on how the schedule works and the Alsco 300 at Las Vegas moves later in the month and into the playoffs.
 The Charlotte Roval race is now later in the fall and in October instead of September.
 After being the second-to-last race of the season for many years, Phoenix Raceway will be the last race of the season after Homestead was bumped back to March. However, because of how the schedule works (only one off-weekend in the playoffs instead of two), it will remain on the same weekend in early November, and the season will end a week earlier than in the past.

Schedule changes due to the COVID-19 pandemic
The EchoPark 250 at Atlanta Motor Speedway and the 2020Census.gov 300 at Homestead–Miami Speedway were originally announced on March 12, 2020, due to the coronavirus (COVID-19) pandemic to take place without fans in attendance, but one day later on March 13, 2020, in respect of the NBA 2019–2020 season suspension, NASCAR announced that the two Cup races (including support races) would be postponed.
 On March 16, 2020, NASCAR announced all race events through May 3 were postponed due to the coronavirus (COVID-19) pandemic.
 On April 30, 2020, the sanctioning body announced an updated schedule for the month of May that included Xfinity races at Darlington Raceway and Charlotte Motor Speedway.
 On May 8, 2020, NASCAR announced that Chicagoland Speedway will not host an Xfinity Series race in 2020. A 2nd event at Darlington Raceway will replace the Chicagoland's race. That will be the first time since 2004 that Darlington hosts 2 Xfinity Series events in the same year.
On May 14, 2020, NASCAR announced that Iowa Speedway will not host an Xfinity Series race in 2020. A second event at Homestead-Miami Speedway will replace the first Iowa race, while a second event at Kansas Speedway (announced on June 2) will replace the second Iowa race. That will be the first time ever that either Homestead or Kansas hosts two Xfinity Series events in the same year.
 On May 27, 2020, it was announced that the rescheduled Bristol race, scheduled for Saturday, May 30, would be rescheduled again to Monday, June 1 as a result of the Cup race at Charlotte originally scheduled for May 27 being delayed by a day due to rain. The reason for moving the Xfinity Bristol race to Monday night was logistics of moving NASCAR's timing and scoring, video replay, and television broadcasting equipment would not be set up and ready in time.
 The Dash 4 Cash races were supposed to be at Texas Motor Speedway, Bristol Motor Speedway, Talladega Superspeedway and Dover International Speedway, but after all the COVID-19 schedule changes, they changed to Atlanta, Homestead, Talladega, and Pocono with Bristol now serving as the qualification race for the Dash 4 Cash. Despite being in the middle of the races that do have it, the Saturday Homestead race will not be a Dash 4 Cash race.
 On July 8, 2020, NASCAR announced the series' schedule in the month of August. This included the move of the Watkins Glen race to the Daytona infield road course as a result of failing to get a waiver of Governor Andrew Cuomo's 14 day quarantine rule for anyone entering the state of New York from states that are COVID-19 hot spots, which includes North Carolina, where NASCAR teams are based. In that announcement, it was also made official that the standalone race at Mid-Ohio race would be cancelled and replaced, and the same would go for the June Michigan race, which had been scheduled in June but when the Cup Series races became a doubleheader, the date clashed with Road America, despite being a standalone race. Later, on August 6, NASCAR announced that an additional race at Talladega would replace the cancelled Mid-Ohio race and will be part of the Xfinity Series playoffs. An additional race at Richmond would replace the cancelled Michigan event. In that announcement, it was also revealed that the Xfinity Series playoff opener has been moved to Las Vegas Motor Speedway.

Results and standings

Race results

Drivers' championship

(key) Bold – Pole position awarded by time. Italics – Pole position set by final practice results or owner's points. * – Most laps led. 1 – Stage 1 winner. 2 – Stage 2 winner1–10 – Regular season top 10 finishers.
. – Eliminated after Round of 12
. – Eliminated after Round of 8

Owners' championship (Top 15)
(key) Bold - Pole position awarded by time. Italics - Pole position set by final practice results or rainout. * – Most laps led. 1 – Stage 1 winner. 2 – Stage 2 winner. 1-10 – Owners' regular season top 10 finishers. 
. – Eliminated after Round of 12
. – Eliminated after Round of 8

Manufacturers' championship

See also
 2020 NASCAR Cup Series
 2020 NASCAR Gander RV & Outdoors Truck Series
 2020 ARCA Menards Series
 2020 ARCA Menards Series East
 2020 ARCA Menards Series West
 2020 NASCAR Whelen Modified Tour
 2020 NASCAR Pinty's Series
 2020 NASCAR Whelen Euro Series
 2020 eNASCAR iRacing Pro Invitational Series
 2020 EuroNASCAR Esports Series

References

NASCAR Xfinity Series seasons
Xfinity Series
Xfinity Series
NASCAR Xfinity Series